The Ankang Dam is gravity dam on the Hanjiang (Han) River near Ankang in Shaanxi Province, China. The main purpose of the dam is hydroelectric power production along with other purposes such as flood control and navigation. The dam withholds a  reservoir which supplies water to its powerhouse located on the right toe. The power station contains 4 x 200 MW generators for a total installed capacity of 800 MW. On the dam's surface adjacent to the power house are five controlled spillway chutes. The dam also houses five mid-level openings and four base openings for discharging water as well.

He Jing was the chief designer of the dam. Construction began in 1978 and the dam structure was complete on December 23, 1989. Almost a year later on  December 12, 1990, the first generator became operational. It was not until December 25, 1992, that all four generators were operational and by 1995, the entire project was complete.

See also 

 List of power stations in China

References 

Hydroelectric power stations in Shaanxi
Dams in China
Dams completed in 1989